Srinivas Rangaraj (15 August 1932 – 2 February 2010) was an Indian cricketer who played in sixteen first-class matches for Mysore between 1952 and 1961.

References

External links
 

1932 births
2010 deaths
Indian cricketers
Karnataka cricketers
Place of birth missing